The Strathbutler Award is a biennial prize awarded to a New Brunswick visual artist. It was first awarded in 1991 as an annual prize of $10,000, which increased to $15,000 in 2005. In 2011 it became a biennial award with a value of $25,000, the highest for any visual art prize in New Brunswick.

The Strathbutler is awarded by the Sheila Hugh Mackay Foundation, which was founded in 1987 by the New Brunswick philanthropist in order to promote the visual arts and fine crafts. A native of Saint John, Mackay lived from the mid 1980s in a cottage on her family's Rothesay estate, which was called Strathnaver. The cottage having been previously occupied by a man named Butler, she called her house Strathbutler, and later gave the name to her foundation's first art prize.

The Strathbutler Award recipients are chosen by jury. Once informed of the jury's choice, Mackay personally called the winners to congratulate them, and presented them with their awards, accompanied by a poem of her own composition, at a gala. Mackay died in 2004.

Since 2015 award recipients have received an "iconic presentation piece" in the form of a sterling silver and copper knife designed by 2006 Strathbutler laureate Brigitte Clavette. The design is based on the Mackay family crest and named Manu forti (with a strong hand), after the family's motto.

Recipients
1991 John Hooper 
1992 Tom Smith 
1993 Peter Powning 
1994 Kathy Hooper
1995 Nel Oudemans
1996 :fr:Marie Hélène Allain
1997 Freeman Patterson
1998 :fr:Roméo Savoie
1999 Suzanne Hill
2000 Rick Burns
2001 Gerard Collins
2002 Gordon Dunphy
2003 Thaddeus Holownia
2004 Janice Wright Cheney
2005 André Lapointe
2006 Brigitte Clavette
2007 Dan Steeves
2008 Anna Torma
2009 David Umholtz
2010 Linda Rae Dornan
2011 Herzl Kashetsky
2013 Susan Vida Judah
2015 Paul Mathieson
2017 Herménégilde Chiasson
2019 Bruce Gray
2021 Mathieu Léger

References

Awards established in 1991
Canadian art awards
1991 establishments in Canada